Michael J. Reilly Jr. (born July 13, 1993) is an American professional ice hockey defenseman currently playing for the Providence Bruins in the American Hockey League (AHL) while under contract to the Boston Bruins of the National Hockey League (NHL). He was originally selected by the Columbus Blue Jackets in the fourth round (98th overall) of the 2011 NHL Entry Draft and previously played in the NHL for the Minnesota Wild, Montreal Canadiens and Ottawa Senators.

Playing career
Born in Chicago, Reilly grew up in Chanhassen, Minnesota. After attending and playing for the Academy of Holy Angels and Shattuck-St Mary's, Reilly was selected by the Columbus Blue Jackets in the 2011 NHL Entry Draft. Opting not to sign with the Blue Jackets, he went on to play for the University of Minnesota Golden Gophers. Reilly was named Big Ten Conference Defensive Player of the Year and First Team All-American following both his sophomore and junior seasons.

Reilly became an unrestricted free agent on June 15, 2015, after he was unable to come to terms on a contract with Columbus. On July 1, 2015, he signed a two-year entry level contract with the Minnesota Wild worth $1.85 million, and on January 9, 2016 Reilly made his NHL debut in a 2-1 Minnesota victory over the Dallas Stars. He scored his first NHL goal on February 13, 2016, in a 4-2 loss to the Boston Bruins.

On February 26, 2018, Minnesota traded Reilly to the Montreal Canadiens in exchange for a fifth-round pick in the 2019 NHL Entry Draft. He signed a two-year extension with Montreal worth $3 million following the 2018–19 season. On January 2, 2020, Reilly was traded to the Ottawa Senators in exchange for Andrew Sturtz and a fifth-round pick in 2021.

After parts of two seasons in Ottawa, Reilly was traded by the Senators to the Boston Bruins in exchange for a third-round pick in the 2022 NHL Entry Draft on April 11, 2021.

On July 27, 2021, Reilly signed a three-year, $9 million contract extension with the Bruins.

Due to the Bruins battling cap issues, Reilly was placed on waivers by the Bruins on November 9, 2022. He later cleared.

On February 24, 2023, Reilly scored his first professional hat-trick in a 6-5 win for the Providence Bruins, adding two assists as well, resulting in a five-point night.

Personal life
Reilly's father, Michael Sr., was drafted by the Montreal Canadiens in the eighth round of the 1977 NHL amateur draft but ultimately never played in the National Hockey League.

Career statistics

Regular season and playoffs

International

Awards and honors

References

External links

1993 births
Living people
AHCA Division I men's ice hockey All-Americans
American expatriate ice hockey players in Canada
American men's ice hockey defensemen
Boston Bruins players
Columbus Blue Jackets draft picks
Iowa Wild players
Minnesota Golden Gophers men's ice hockey players
Minnesota Wild players
People from Chanhassen, Minnesota
Ice hockey players from Minnesota
Montreal Canadiens players
Ottawa Senators players
Penticton Vees players
Providence Bruins players